The 11th Shorty Awards were held on May 5, 2019, in New York City at the PlayStation Theater. The ceremony was hosted by American actress and comedian Kathy Griffin, along with a music performance by Tank and the Bangas. The event was live streamed on YouTube and Twitter with presenters including Denzel Dion, Devin Lytle, Eva Gutowski, Freddie Ransome, Grace Helbig, Jay Shetty, Lauren Giraldo, Mamrie Hart, Meghan Currie, Miles McKenna, Molly Burke, Raymond Braun, Remi Cruz, Ryland Adams, Samir Mezrahi, Sean Evans, Shangela, and The Try Guys.

Influencer winners and nominees 
Nominations were announced on January 28, 2019, with public voting closing on February 21, 2019. Finalists were announced on March 20, 2019. Winners were announced at the ceremony on May 5, 2019. New categories added this year included Innovator of the Year, Tik Toker of the Year, and Storyteller of the Year.

Winners are listed first and in boldface.

Arts & Entertainment

Content of the Year

Creative & Media

Team Internet

Tech & Innovation

Brand and Organization winners and nominees

References 
 11th Annual Shorty Awards Winners 
 11th Annual Shorty Awards Nominees 
 11th Annual Shorty Awards Brand & Organization Finalists
 11th Annual Shorty Awards Brand & Organization Winners and Honorees

Shorty Awards
2019 in Internet culture